Florida's 3rd congressional district is an electoral district of the United States House of Representatives located in Florida. It presently comprises a large section of northern Florida, including the entire counties of Alachua, Clay, Putnam, Bradford, and Union, along with the majority of Marion County. The cities of Gainesville and Palatka are in the district as well as part of Ocala  (its northern suburbs). Some Jacksonville suburbs such as Middleburg, Green Cove Springs, and Orange Park are also in the district.

Redistricting in Florida, effective for the 2012 federal elections, radically altered the nature of the 3rd district. From 1993 through 2012 the district called the 3rd district comprised an entirely different territory, roughly similar to the 5th district . Likewise the present territory of the new 3rd district, as of the 2012 elections, is made up of parts of the former 2nd, 4th, 5th, and 6th districts, though it is geographically similar to the pre-2013 6th district. The former 3rd district was (and present 5th district is) an intentionally gerrymandered territory designed to unite disparate areas of northeastern Florida with significant African-American populations into a black-majority district, and was overwhelmingly Democratic in voting patterns.

The new 3rd district has a majority white population, largely in rural areas and small towns. The only cities of any size in the district are Gainesville and Ocala. The district has been represented by Republican Kat Cammack since 2021.

The old 3rd district was represented from 1993 through 2012 by Corrine Brown, who was elected to the similar new 5th district in the November 2012 elections.

History

While Florida has had at least three congressional districts since the 1900 U.S. Census, the 1993–2012 3rd congressional district dates to reapportionment done by the Florida Legislature after the 1990 U.S. Census. Because Florida has a large population of African Americans, but not a large enough concentration anywhere in the state to easily configure a congressional district with a majority, there were several attempts to create a few gerrymandered districts which were certain to elect an African American candidate. This created an odd coalition of black Democrats and Republicans who supported such districts (since this not only created black-majority districts, but also made "safer" Republican districts elsewhere). This effort was opposed by many white Democrats, but eventually this idea won the support of the state legislature and this district was created as a result.

The 1993–2012 3rd congressional district was geographically diverse. Starting from the southern part of the district, it included the Pine Hills area of the Orlando-Kissimmee Metropolitan Area with small pockets of African-American neighborhoods in the cities of Sanford, Gainesville, Palatka, and finally the larger African American communities of Jacksonville. Connecting these areas were regions which are sparsely populated—either expansive rural areas or narrow strips which are only a few miles wide. Barack Obama received 73% of the vote in this district in the 2008 Presidential election.

General history of the district in its varying territories

Recent election results in statewide races

List of members representing the district

Recent election results

2002

2004

2006

2008

2010

2012

2014

2016

2018

2020

2022

Historical district boundaries

References

 
 
 Congressional Biographical Directory of the United States 1774–present

03